Melaky is a region in northwestern Madagascar. It borders Boeny Region in northeast, Betsiboka in east, Bongolava in southeast and Menabe in south. The capital of the region is Maintirano. Melaky has the smallest population and the smallest population density of all Malagasy regions.

Administrative divisions
Melaky Region is divided into five districts, which are sub-divided into 32 communes.

 Ambatomainty District - 5 communes
 Antsalova District - 5 communes
 Besalampy District - 6 communes
 Maintirano District - 14 communes
 Morafenobe District - 4 communes

Transport

Airports
Ambatomainty Airport
Antsalova Airport
Besalampy Airport
Maintirano Airport
Morafenobe Airport
Tambohorano Airport

Protected Areas
The Maningoza Reserve and the Bemarivo Reserve are located in the Melaky region.
Beanka New Protected Area
Bemaraha National Park
Part of Ambohijanahary Reserve
Tsimembo-Manambolomaty Complex
Mandrozo New Protected Area

Economy

Mining
Ankililoaka mine

See also 
 Mahajanga province

References

EBDM

 
Regions of Madagascar